This is a list of Australian Statutory Instruments from 1908.

1908 Commonwealth Of Australia Numbered Acts 
 The Excise Procedure Act 1907 (no. 1, 1908)
 The Supply Act (no 5) 1907-8 (no. 2, 1908)
 The Quarantine Act 1908 (no. 3, 1908)
 The Officers' Compensation Act 1908 (no. 4, 1908)
 The Australian Industries Preservation Act 1907 (no. 5, 1908)
 The Appropriation Act 1907-8 (no. 6, 1908)
 The Customs Tariff 1908 (no. 7, 1908)
 The Excise Tariff 1908 (no. 8, 1908)
 The Additional Appropriation Act 1905-6 And 1906-7 (no. 9, 1908)
 The Additional Appropriation (works And Buildings) Act 1905-6 And 1906-7 (no. 10, 1908)
 The Additional Appropriation Act 1907-8 (no. 11, 1908)
 The Additional Appropriation (works And Buildings) Act 1907-8 (no. 12, 1908)
 Customs Tariff Amendment 1908 (no. 13, 1908)
 Excise Tariff (starch) 1908 (no. 14, 1908)
 The Surplus Revenue Act 1908 (no. 15, 1908)
 Parliamentary Papers Act 1908 (no. 16, 1908)
 Old-age Pensions Act 1908 (no. 17, 1908)
 Old-age Pensions Appropriation Act 1908 (no. 18, 1908)
 Coast Defence Appropriation Act 1908 (no. 19, 1908)
 Election Expenses Reimbursement Act 1908 (no. 20, 1908)
 The Supply Act (no 1) 1908-9 (no. 21, 1908)
 The Supply Act (no 2) 1908-9 (no. 22, 1908)
 The Appropriation (works And Buildings) Act 1908-9 (no. 23, 1908)
 The Seat Of Government Act 1908 (no. 24, 1908)
 The Immigration Restriction Act 1908 (no. 25, 1908)
 Manufacturers Encouragement Act 1908 (no. 26, 1908)
 The Appropriation Act 1908-9 (no. 27, 1908)

See also  
 List of Acts of the Parliament of Australia
 List of Statutory Instruments of Australia

External links 
 1908 Commonwealth of Australia Numbered Act http://www.austlii.edu.au/au/legis/cth/num_act/1908/
 COMLAW Historical Acts http://www.comlaw.gov.au/Browse/ByTitle/Acts/Historical
 COMLAW Select Statutory Instruments http://www.comlaw.gov.au/Browse/ByYearNumber/SelectLIsandStatRules/Asmade/0/

Lists of the Statutory Instruments of Australia
Statutory Instruments